The Franciscan School of Theology (FST) is a Roman Catholic graduate theological school at the Mission San Luis Rey de Francia in Oceanside, California. It is owned and operated by the Province of Saint Barbara of the Order of Friars Minor. FST is affiliated with the University of San Diego, a private Roman Catholic university in San Diego.

Academic program and accreditation
The Franciscan School of Theology is a small Roman Catholic proprietary school located at Mission San Luis Rey in Oceanside, California.  FST is accredited by the Association of Theological Schools in the United States and Canada, and the Western Association of Schools and Colleges.

The school trains lay men and women of the Roman Catholic Church and offers two degrees:
 Master of Theological Studies (MTS) - A two-year academic degree providing a breadth of theological understanding for general educational purposes.
 Master of Divinity (M Div.) - A three-year professional degree that testifies to proficiency in the sciences and skills necessary for ordination to the priesthood  or lay ecclesial ministry in the Roman Catholic Church.

References

External links
 

Franciscan universities and colleges
Oceanside, California
University of San Diego
Universities and colleges in San Diego County, California
Catholic universities and colleges in California
Association of Catholic Colleges and Universities
Graduate Theological Union
Peace and conflict studies
Schools accredited by the Western Association of Schools and Colleges
Educational institutions established in 1854
1854 establishments in California